51 Atholl Road stands on Atholl Road, the A924, in the Scottish town of Pitlochry, Perth and Kinross. The structure is a Category C listed building designed by Dundee architect John Murray Robertson.

The town library was housed in the ancillary building until 1981.

See also
 List of listed buildings in Pitlochry, Perth and Kinross

References

1895 establishments in Scotland
Atholl Road 51
Category C listed buildings in Perth and Kinross